Conasprella aquitanica is an extinct species of sea snail, a marine gastropod mollusk in the family Conidae, the cone snails and their allies.

Distribution
Fossils of this marine species were found in Oligocene strata in Southwest France.

References

 Lozouet P. (2017). Les Conoidea de l'Oligocène supérieur (Chattien) du bassin de l'Adour (Sud-Ouest de la France). Cossmanniana. 19: 3–180.

External links
 

aquitanica
Gastropods described in 1858